Version City is an American reggae record label and recording studio.

Since its inception in New York City 1997 by local ska veteran King Django, it has changed its location to its current home in New Brunswick, New Jersey. Version City has been the creative outlet of many of Django's productions, especially those backed by the loose line-up that make up the house band, the Version City Rockers. This ensemble usually includes musicians involved in the New York scene such as "Agent" Jay Nugent and Vic Ruggiero of The Slackers, Eddie Ocampo, and Ira Heaps of the Jammyland All-Stars. Since August 2006, Version City parties have been held at the Knitting Factory in New York City, on the first Saturday of every month. These events usually showcase the work of at least one Version City artist, as well as touring bands involved in Jamaican music.

American record labels